The 1919 Kansas State Farmers football team represented Kansas State Agricultural College in the 1919 college football season.

Schedule

References

Kansas State
Kansas State Wildcats football seasons
Kansas State Farmers football